The , also known as "Laview", is an electric multiple unit (EMU) train type operated by the private railway operator Seibu Railway on limited express services in the Tokyo area of Japan. They will replace the 10000 series EMUs currently in service on the Seibu Ikebukuro Line and Chichibu Line.

Design
The trains are designed by Kazuyo Sejima, and feature large windows and a rounded front end with an oval windscreen.

Based on the concept of "a new train that no one has ever seen before," it was designed based on the following design concepts.

A limited express that blends softly into the landscape in the city and nature
A limited express like a living room where everyone can relax
A limited express that creates new value and becomes a destination, not just a means of transportation

Formation
The trains consist of eight cars per set.

Interior
Seating accommodation consists of 2+2 seating, with power outlets at all seats. The interior also features wheelchair spaces and a ladies’ powder room. Free WiFi is provided in all cars.

History
Seven sets were ordered as a replacement for the New Red Arrow EMUs. The first set was presented to reporters at Kotesashi depot on 14 February 2019. The 001 series entered revenue service on 16 March 2019.

In 2020, the train type received the Blue Ribbon Award.

References

External links

 

Electric multiple units of Japan
001 series
Train-related introductions in 2019
1500 V DC multiple units of Japan